The 2001–02 Slovak Extraliga season was the ninth season of the Slovak Extraliga, the top level of ice hockey in Slovakia. 10 teams participated in the league, and HC Slovan Bratislava won the championship.

Standings

Playoffs

Quarterfinals

 HKm Zvolen - MsHK Žilina 4:0  (3 : 0, 6 : 2, 3:0, 5:2)
 HC Slovan Bratislava - MHk 32 Liptovský Mikuláš  4:3 (4 : 2, 3 : 4 OT, 2:1, 2:3 OT, 5 : 2, 1:4, 7 : 1)
 HC Košice – HK 36 Skalica  4:1  (5 : 2, 6 : 0, 1:5, 3:1, 4 : 1)
 ŠKP PS Poprad - Dukla Trenčín  4:1  (2 : 3 OT, 6 : 0, 3:1, 3:2 OT, 3 : 2)

Semifinals 

 HKm Zvolen - HK ŠKP Poprad  4:0  (5 : 2, 6 : 1, 3:1, 4:1)
 HC Slovan Bratislava - HC Košice  4:2  (2 : 1, 4 : 2, 2:4, 1:2, 4 : 3 OT, 5:1)

Final

 HKm Zvolen - HC Slovan Bratislava 2:4  (3 : 4, 3 : 6, 3:1, 2:3 OT 8 : 1, 1:4)

Relegation 

 MHC Nitra - HK Spišská Nová Ves  2:4  (1:3, 4:1, 5:6 SO, 1:5, 3:2, 1:7)

External links
 Slovak Ice Hockey Federation

Slovak Extraliga seasons
2001–02 in European ice hockey leagues
Slovak